Kabarkada, Break the Bank is a Philippine TV game show by Endemol. It aired from August 27 to December 28, 2007 on Studio 23 and is hosted by Mo Twister. The show is a spin-off from ABS-CBN's Kapamilya, Deal or No Deal which is also from Endemol.

Segments

Star Value
(Celebrity offer)
A videotaped recording of a big star, popular celebrity/personality offers a prize to the contestant, which could be from her/his sponsors or endorsement products or her/his personal items.

Mo-ltiply
(derived from Mo's name - host)
The unknown amount inside the suitcase is automatically multiplied up to five times its original value.

For-bidding Question
This segment is derived from the controversial and most talked about radio segment of DJ Twister, entitled "Forbidden Question". The caller answers a trivia question and can bid to add more money to the suitcase. Contestant can add a certain amount to what is inside the suitcase, and it is up to Mo to approve it, provided that the contestant can answer a rather easy trivia question. A question has a corresponding money prize. The money prize can be sponsored by a client.

Banker on the street
A man-on-the-street video recording is shown, offering the contestant prizes ranging from cash to simple funny things like a comb or a piggy bank.

See also
List of programs aired by Studio 23
Kapamilya, Deal or No Deal

References

External links
 Break the Bank over Studio 23

Studio 23 original programming
Philippine game shows
Deal or No Deal
Philippine television series based on Dutch television series
2007 Philippine television series debuts
2007 Philippine television series endings